This is a list of closed or inoperative passenger railway stations in Brisbane, Queensland, Australia.

Airport (became Eagle Farm)
Albert
Bowen Hills (original location)
Bowen Park
Bunour
Camp Mountain
Dayboro
Doboy
Eagle Farm (both; see page)
Gloucester Street
Holm's Halt
Holmview (original location)
Mayne Junction
Meeandah
Newstead
Normanby
Northgate (original location)
Nyanda
Pinkenba
Riverton
Samford
Samsonvale
Stanley Street
Thorroldtown
Tennyson
Toowong Sports Ground
Woolloongabba
Whinstanes

References

See also
 List of South East Queensland railway stations

History of Brisbane
Public transport in Brisbane

Brisbane
Railway stations
Queensland transport-related lists